Siraya is a Formosan language spoken until the end of the 19th century by the indigenous Siraya people of Taiwan, derived from Proto-Siraya. Some scholars believe Taivoan and Makatao are two dialects of Siraya, but now more evidence shows that they should be classified as separate languages.

Several Siraya communities have been involved in a Sirayan cultural and language revitalization movement for more than a decade. Through linguistic research and language teaching, the natives are 'awaking' their ancestors mother tongue that has been 'dormant' for a century. Today a group of Siraya children in Sinhua District of Tainan particularly in Kou-pei and Chiou Chen Lin area are able to speak and sing in the Siraya language.

Dialects

The Sirayaic languages were previously thought to include three languages or dialects:

Siraya proper — spoken in the coastal area of Tainan Plain.
Taivoan — spoken mostly in the inland of Tainan Plain to the north (just west of Southern Tsouic territories).
Makatao — spoken in Kaohsiung and Pingtung Prefectures to the south (just west of Paiwan territories).

However, more and more evidences have shown that Siraya, Taivoan, and Makatao are three different languages, rather than three dialects:

Documentary evidence 
In "De Dagregisters van het Kasteel Zeelandia" written by the Dutch colonizers during 1629–1662, it was clearly said that when the Dutch people would like to speak to the chieftain of Cannacannavo (Kanakanavu), they needed to translate from Dutch to Sinckan (Siraya), from Sinckan to Tarroequan (possibly a Paiwan or a Rukai language), from Tarroequan to Taivoan, and from Taivoan to Cannacannavo."...... in Cannacannavo: Aloelavaos tot welcken de vertolckinge in Sinccans, Tarrocquans en Tevorangs geschiede, weder voor een jaer aengenomen" — "De Dagregisters van het Kasteel Zeelandia", pp.6–8

Linguistic evidence 
A comparison of numerals of Siraya, Taivoan (Tevorangh dialect), and Makatao (Kanapo dialect) with Proto-Austronesian language show the difference among the three Austronesian languages in southwestern Taiwan in the early 20th century:

In 2009,  further proved the relationship among the three languages, based on the latest linguistic observations below:

Based on the discovery, Li attempted two classification trees:

1. Tree based on the number of phonological innovations
Sirayaic
Taivoan
Siraya–Makatao
Siraya
Makatao

2. Tree based on the relative chronology of sound changes
Sirayaic
Siraya
Taivoan–Makatao
Taivoan
Makatau

Li (2009) considers the second tree (the one containing the Taivoan–Makatao group) to be the somewhat more likely one.

Lee (2015) regards that, when Siraya was a lingua franca among at least eight indigenous communities in southwestern Taiwan plain, Taivoan people from Tevorangh, who has been proved to have their own language in "De Dagregisters van het Kasteel Zeelandia", might still need the translation service from Wanli, a neighbor community that shared common hunting field and also a militarily alliance with Tevorangh.

Sources

The Siraya language entered the historical record in the early 17th century when traders from the Dutch East India Company, expelled from mainland China and Chinese waters, set up a stronghold on Taiwan at Fort Zeelandia, which was in the Siraya-speaking area. During the period of Dutch rule in Taiwan, Calvinist missionaries used Siraya and Babuza (also known as Favorlang) as contact languages. A translation of the Gospel of St. Matthew into Siraya (174 pages of Siraya and Dutch text, Gravius 1661) and a catechism in Siraya (288 pages of Siraya and Dutch text, Gravius 1662) were published, and have been subsequently republished. The Dutch colony was driven out in 1661 by Ming loyalist refugees from China, and Taiwan was subsequently incorporated into the Qing Empire. During the period of Qing Dynasty rule, use of Siraya receded, but some Siraya language materials survive in the form of Siraya land contracts with Chinese translations, known as the Sinckan Manuscripts. The last records were lists of words made in the early 19th century.

The Tainan Pe-po Siraya Culture Association published a modern-day Siraya glossary in 2008, authored by Edgar Macapili. A paper published in 2021 reports on a translation of the Gospel of St. John that had recently been identified by the author in the Royal Danish Library.

Phonology
The phonological system of Siraya is speculated by Adelaar (1997) to have the following phonemes.

Consonants (18–20 total)

Vowels (7 total)
a, ä, i (ĭ), e, ə, u (ŭ), o

Diphthongs (6 total)
ay, ey, uy, äw, aw, ow

Palatalization also occurs in many words.

Grammar
Siraya auxiliaries constitute an open class and are placed at the head of the verb phrase (Adelaar 1997).

Pronouns
The Siraya personal pronouns below are from Adelaar (1997).

Function words
The list of function words below is sourced from Adelaar (1997).

Demonstratives
atta, k(a)-atta 'this, these'
anna, k(a)-anna 'that, those'

Interrogatives
mang 'what?'
ti mang 'who?'
tu mang 'where'
mama mang, mama ki mang, mameymang 'how?'
kaumang 'why?'

Negation markers
assi (also "aoussi") 'no(t)'
ĭnna' don't'
nĭnno 'nothing'
mi-kakua.. . assi ("myhkaqua ... assi") 'never'
ĭnnang ("ynnang") 'refuse to, not want to; don't'

Other words
ti – personal article
ta – topic marker
tu – locative marker
ki – default relation marker
tu ämäx ki – "before"
tu lam ki – "together with"
ka – coordinating conjunction (links verbal clauses)

Verbs
The following list of Siraya verb affixes is from Adelaar (1997).

Affixes
ni-: past tense
ma-, m-, -m-: actor focus / orientation
pa-: undergoer focus / orientation
mey- ~ pey-: actor- and undergoer-oriented verbs (used with verbs describing a high degree of physical involvement)
mu- ~ (p)u-: actor- and undergoer-oriented verbs (used with verbs describing a movement toward something)
ma-: stative intransitive verbs; words with no apparent word-class affiliations (precategorials)
paka-: causative
pa-: transitive (often with causative result)
ka-: expresses feeling, emotion, sensation (undergoer-oriented verbs and deverbal nouns only)
-ən, -an: undergoer focus / orientation
-a, -ey, -aw: irrealis
-(l)ato: possibly a perfective marker

See also Proto-Austronesian language for a list of Proto-Austronesian verbal affixes.

Classifiers
Like Bunun and many other Formosan languages, Siraya has a rich set of verbal classifier prefixes.

mattäy- / pattäy-: "talking, saying"
smaki-: "throwing,casting"
sau-: "swearing, making an oath"
mu-, pu-: movement into a certain direction
mey- / pey-: high degree of physical involvement
sa-: movement through a narrow place
taw-: downward movement, a movement within a confined space

Numerals
Siraya has a base ten numeral system with the following forms:

Examples

See also
Daniel Gravius – Siraya language scholar
Sinckan Manuscripts
Taivoan language

Notes

References

Further reading

 

Formosan languages
Extinct languages of Asia
Languages extinct in the 19th century